Antiblemma anguinea is a moth of the family Noctuidae. It is found in Costa Rica.

References

Moths described in 1911
Catocalinae
Moths of Central America